Ábelová (earlier also Abelová, Jabelová) is a village and municipality in the Lučenec District in the Banská Bystrica Region of Slovakia.

History
The village arose in the early 13th century. In historical records, it was first mentioned in 1275 (Abelfeuld). It belonged to Halič and until the 16th century partly also to Divín.

Genealogical resources

The records for genealogical research are available at the state archive "Statny Archiv in Banska Bystrica, Slovakia"

 Roman Catholic church records(births/marriages/deaths): 1755-1898
 Lutheran church records(births/marriages/deaths): 1736-1895 (parish A)
 Census records 1869 of Abelova are not available at the state archive.

See also
 List of municipalities and towns in Slovakia

References

External links
 
 
http://www.statistics.sk/mosmis/eng/run.html
http://www.e-obce.sk/obec/abelova/abelova.html
Surnames of living people in Abelova

Villages and municipalities in Lučenec District